Albion Mills Retail Park is a retail park in central Wakefield, West Yorkshire, England. The park, which contains a branch of PC World, was built in 2000. It was acquired by CB Richard Ellis Realty Trust in July 2008 at a cost of £10.5 million (US$20,805,750). The shopping complex covers an area of 55,294 square feet.

References

Buildings and structures in Wakefield
Shopping centres in West Yorkshire
2000s establishments in England
Retail parks in the United Kingdom